Front Mission is a series of tactical role-playing games produced by Square Enix (originally Square). The music of the series includes the soundtracks to the main series, composed of Front Mission through Front Mission 5: Scars of the War, as well as the spin-off games, which include Front Mission Series: Gun Hazard, Front Mission Alternative, Front Mission: Online, Front Mission 2089 and its remake Front Mission 2089: Border of Madness, Front Mission 2089-II, and Front Mission Evolved. The soundtracks of the series' installments have been released in album form in Japan, with the exceptions of 2089, 2089-II, and Border of Madness, which reuse music from the other installments, and Evolved, which was published in 2010. The soundtrack to Front Mission was released in 1995 by NTT Publishing, which also published the soundtrack to Front Mission: Gun Hazard in 1996. DigiCube published soundtrack albums for Front Mission 2 and Alternative in 1997 and 3 in 1999. Square Enix published the albums for Front Mission 4 in 2004, and 5 and Online in 2006.

The soundtracks of the series have been warmly reviewed by critics, especially those of the main series and Gun Hazard. The music of Alternative and Online was less well received. The music of the series typically includes a fusion of electronic and orchestral music, though each game and composer in the series has taken the music in different directions. The composers for the series have included Yoko Shimomura, Noriko Matsueda, Koji Hayama, Hayato Matsuo, Hidenori Iwasaki, and Garry Schyman. A box set of music from across the series is currently planned, but has not yet been formally announced or given a release date.

Main series

Front Mission 

Front Mission Original Sound Version is a soundtrack album which contains music from Front Mission, the first game in the series. The tracks were composed by Yoko Shimomura and Noriko Matsueda; Shimomura penned the action themes while Matsueda handled the calmer tracks. The game was the first soundtrack that Matsueda had composed. Shimomura, a veteran of over a dozen games, was already at the time busy composing the soundtrack for Super Mario RPG but found herself unable to refuse to work on Front Mission after being asked by Sakaguchi to co-compose the music. Shimomura feels that the soundtrack turned out to be very "passionate" due to the two composers' motivation. The album has been described as containing a mix of techno and smooth jazz. The album was published by NTT Publishing on February 25, 1995 with the catalog number PSCN-5019, and was reprinted on October 1, 2004 with the catalog number NTCP-5019. The album contains 42 tracks and covers a duration of 1:08:17.

The album was well received by critics such as Daniel Kalabakov of RPGFan, who claimed that it was his favorite Super Nintendo Entertainment System-era Square soundtrack, primarily due to the mixture of techno and jazz. He preferred Shimomura's techno tracks, but enjoyed the way the two styles mixed together. Kero Hazel of Square Enix Music Online similarly praised the mix of the two styles, though he criticized the sound quality of the album and stated that the album would have been improved by using real instruments rather than synthesized ones.

In 2003, Front Mission was re-released for the PlayStation as Front Mission 1st, and a corresponding promotional sound track album was released as Front Mission 1st Special BGM Selection. The nine-track album contains eight tracks by Shimomura and Matsueda, arranged by Hidenori Iwasaki, and one new track by Iwasaki out of the five he composed for the remake. It was published by Square Enix on October 23, 2003 with the catalog number FM1-DA, and has a total length of 18:25. Patrick Gann of RPGFan described the album as a good sampler for the full soundtrack, and claimed that it had slightly better sound quality. He also felt that the new track was a good addition to the rest. Dave of Square Enix Music Online agreed with these praises, though he felt that the large amount of overlap between the promotional disc and the full soundtrack made its purchase not worthwhile.

Track list

Front Mission 2 

The soundtrack of Front Mission 2, the second game of the main series and the third game released after Front Mission Series: Gun Hazard, was composed by Noriko Matsueda. It was her second solo video game soundtrack, after Bahamut Lagoon, and the fourth soundtrack she had worked on. The music of the game differs from that of its prequel in that it "incorporates an atmospheric, airy sound", and does not include pieces like Shimomura's techno tracks from the first game. An album of music from the game, titled Front Mission 2 Original Soundtrack, was released by DigiCube on September 21, 1997. The 43-track, 1:15:45-long album has a catalog number of SSCX-10011, and a limited edition of the soundtrack was also released.

The album was well received by critics. A reviewer from RPGFan termed it an "excellent soundtrack" that kept the feel of the first game. Kero Hazel of Square Enix Music Online felt similarly about the album. They noted that the soundtrack had enough thematic ties to the first game's music to connect the two games without losing originality, and concluded that it was superior to the already good Front Mission soundtrack.

Front Mission 3 

The soundtrack of Front Mission 3, the third game of the main series and the fifth game of the total series, was composed by Koji Hayama and Hayato Matsuo, with one track contributed by Shigeki. Matsuo handled the orchestral pieces, while Hayama worked on the techno ones. The pieces were performed with synthesizers that were designed to sound like higher-quality versions of the types of sounds used in the original Front Mission, rather than sounding more like the actual instruments they represented. Hitoshi Sakimoto worked for Square as an in-house composer during the game's development, and was the one who invited Matsuo, who was an independent composer, to meet the sound team and work on the game. An album of music from the game, titled Front Mission 3 Original Soundtrack, was released by DigiCube on September 22, 1999. The two-disc album has 47 tracks, is 2:30:00 long, and has a catalog number of SSCX-10035.

The album was well received by critics such as Kero Hazel of Square Enix Music Online, who noted that the synthesizer effects tied the music back stylistically to that of the original game, and applauded the contributions by both composers. A reviewer from RPGFan agreed, though he was more impressed with Hayama's pieces than those of Matsuo.

Track list

Front Mission 4 

The soundtrack of Front Mission 4, the fourth game of the main series and the sixth game overall, was composed by Hidenori Iwasaki, with some tracks contributed by Ryo Yamazaki. The game was Iwasaki's first as a composer, as he had previously only worked as a synthesizer programmer. The music has been described as very different from the "very abstract and heavy" music of the previous game, and much more similar to the music of the first game with an emphasis on melody as well as light and thematic elements. The soundtrack also incorporates "South American"-style elements, with the use of pan flutes and tribal percussion. The music from the game was bundled with music from the remake of the first, Front Mission 1st, and the album was titled Front Mission 4 plus 1st Original Soundtrack. It was released by Square Enix on May 10, 2004. The four-disc album has two discs devoted to each game, and has 97 tracks. It is 3:24:24 long, and has catalog numbers of SQEX-10021~4.

The album was well received by Ben Schweitzer of RPGFan. Preferring the Front Mission 4 tracks to the 1st tracks, he complimented the album as "impressive", especially given that it was the "first work of a promising new composer". While he did not feel that all of the tracks were of consistent quality, he said that none of them were "bad" and that the more "atmospheric" tracks stood out as particularly noteworthy. Reviewers from Square Enix Music Online had similar praises and criticisms, calling it "not the most diverse or consistent of Front Mission scores" but still "highly worthy"; they also noted the atmospheric tracks as worthy of note.

Track list

Front Mission 5 

The soundtrack of Front Mission 5: Scars of the War, the sixth game of the main series and the ninth game overall, was composed by Hidenori Iwasaki and Kenichiro Fukui, with one track each provided by Hayato Matsuo, Yasuhiro Yamanaka and Masayoshi Soken. The music has been described as a mixture of "standard orchestral elements, with an emphasis on brass and drumlines, and electronic elements, such as synthesized percussion and techno-styled beats". The music differed from that of the previous game in its inclusion of tracks that were solely electronic, rather than a mixture of techno and orchestral. The music from the game was released on an album was titled Front Mission 5 ~Scars of the War~ Original Soundtrack. It was released by Square Enix on January 25, 2006. The three-disc album has 71 tracks, is 2:43:07 long, and has catalog numbers of SQEX-10055~7.

The album was very well received by reviewers such as Ben Schweitzer, who termed it "everything I could have hoped for". He felt that the soundtrack represented Iwasaki's maturation as a composer, especially in regards to the more action-based tracks. He concluded that the soundtrack was "superior" to that of Front Mission 4, and that it was also quite different from most video game soundtracks in regards to instrumentation and style. Square Enix Music Online also noted the improvement between Front Mission 4 and 5, and declared that, despite Iwasaki's skill with atmospheric tracks, that the battle tracks were the best of the album.

Track list

Spinoffs

Front Mission Series: Gun Hazard 

Front Mission Series: Gun Hazard was the first spin-off game in the series, and the second game released overall. Its soundtrack was composed by Nobuo Uematsu and Yasunori Mitsuda, with additional tracks provided by Junya Nakano and Masashi Hamauzu. The soundtrack was the second collaboration between Nobuo Uematsu and Yasunori Mitsuda, after Chrono Trigger. According to Uematsu, Mitsuda worked so much on the soundtrack that he eventually had to be hospitalized. The soundtrack has a "mechanical" theme to its music, and incorporates both electronic and traditional instruments. The music from the game was released on an album titled Front Mission Series: Gun Hazard Original Sound Track. It was released by NTT Publishing on February 25, 1996. The two-disc album has 60 tracks, is 2:30:25 long, and has catalog numbers of PSCN-5044~5.

Kero Hazel of Square Enix Music Online called the soundtrack album "a thumping example of fine industrial music" and complimented its use of other musical styles to influence that core style. Patrick Gann of RPGFan also praised the album as "downright awesome" and highly recommended it.

Track list

Front Mission Alternative 

Front Mission Alternative was the second spin-off game in the series, and the fourth game released overall. Its soundtrack was composed by Riow Arai. Arai was a "mainstream dance musician", who had previously composed the soundtrack for Sega Touring Car Championship. For the game, which unlike previous ones in the series was a real-time strategy game, Arai composed a techno soundtrack. The music has been described as "drastically different from the rest of the series". The soundtrack was released on the Front Mission Alternative album by DigiCube on November 21, 1997, and was reprinted by Square Enix on November 22, 2006. The album has 16 tracks, is 1:12:39 long, and has the catalog number of SSCX-10010 in its first issuance and SQEX-10081 for its second. The soundtrack album release was preceded by a promotional vinyl release in July 1997 with the catalog number of SSCX-20010, containing six tracks from the game.

The album was poorly received by Chris Greening of Square Enix Music Online, who called it a largely unsuccessful experiment due to its "repetitiveness and inappropriateness". He felt that several of the tracks went on for far too long without any change, and that the music did not fit the game due to Square not providing feedback to Arai about how the tracks were to be used. Greg Kasavin of GameSpot, in his review of the game, called the soundtrack "a bunch of dizzying techno that doesn't suit the onscreen grandeur".

Front Mission: Online 

Front Mission: Online was the third spin-off game in the series, and the eighth game released overall. Its soundtrack was primarily composed of arrangements of music from prior games in the series, though a few original tracks were composed by Hidenori Iwasaki. The arranged music covered every prior game with the exception of Gun Hazard, and was arranged by Iwasaki from the compositions of Iwasaki, Hayato Matsuo, Yoko Shimomura, Noriko Matsueda, Ryo Yamazaki, and Riow Arai. The music was published as a 35-track album by Square Enix on September 20, 2006. The 1:13:19 album has a catalog number of SQEX-10078.

Chris Greening of Square Enix Music Online gave the album a poor review, calling it "a mediocre effort". He found the majority of the arrangements to be lackluster and unimaginative. Ben Schweitzer of RPGFan, however, was less harsh in his review of the album, calling it "a positive look at the entire series" and saying that the majority of it was good, though the original tracks were not particularly strong.

Front Mission Evolved 

Front Mission Evolved was the fourth spin-off game in the series, and the eleventh game released overall. It was composed by Garry Schyman, the first non-Japanese composer for the series or any other major Square Enix series. He was brought onto the project by Double Helix Games, who developed the game for Square Enix. Garry Schyman describes the music as "orchestral and mostly tonal" with a heavy militaristic theme; almost all of the music is combat or action-themed. The music is more traditionally orchestral than previous Front Mission soundtracks, and was recorded with a live orchestra. As Square Enix intended the game and its music to be a departure from previous games in the series, Schyman purposely did not listen to any of the music from prior games.

The soundtrack is not planned to be released as a physical album, though it is also planned to be included in a box release of music from the entire series. A sampler album of music from missions 01 to 05 from the game's single player campaign was released by Square Enix on the iTunes and Mora music stores on September 30, 2010, under the title Front Mission Evolved Original Soundtrack / Mission 01 to 05. This digital album contains 14 tracks and has a length of 23:47. The final track is a bonus tune done by DJ Kaya, "Military Tune/α：Kalen".

Other games and legacy
The other games in the series are the cell phone games Front Mission 2089 and Front Mission 2089-II, and the Nintendo DS remake of 2089, Front Mission 2089: Border of Madness. 2089, 2089-II, and 2089: Border of Madness did not include any new music, instead reusing music from prior games in the series. There have not been any album releases of their music. In addition to the soundtrack albums, two songs composed by Shimomura from Front Mission, "Take the Offensive" and "Manifold Irons", were orchestrated for her Drammatica: The Very Best of Yoko Shimomura album.

References 

Front Mission
Front Mission